The table below lists the judgments of the Constitutional Court of South Africa delivered in 2019.

The members of the court at the start of 2019 were Chief Justice Mogoeng Mogoeng, Deputy Chief Justice Raymond Zondo, and judges Edwin Cameron, Johan Froneman, Chris Jafta, Sisi Khampepe, Mbuyiseli Madlanga, Nonkosi Mhlantla and Leona Theron. There were two vacancies. Justice Cameron retired with effect from 20 August. Zukisa Tshiqi and Steven Majiedt were appointed to the court with effect from 1 October.

References
 

2019
Constitutional Court